Shilipu may refer to:

 Shilipu station (Beijing Subway) (十里堡)
 Shilipu station (Wuhan Metro) (十里铺)
 Shilipu, Beijing
 Shilipu Village, Xincai County, Henan Province (十里铺)
 Shilipu Township, Guangping County, Hebei Province (十里铺)
 Shilipu Township, Changli County, Hebei Province (十里铺)
 Shilipu, Meichuan, a village in Wuxue, Huanggang, Hubei
 Shilipu (十里铺), Shayang County, Jingmen, Hubei